Clarke W. Brown Sr. (died May 24, 1956) was a Michigan politician.

Career
In 1934, Michigan Secretary of State Frank Fitzgerald was elected Governor of Michigan. On November 13, Governor-elect Fitzgerald resigned as secretary of state. The resignation was effective November 15. Fitzgerald had made prior arrangements with Governor William Comstock, that after Fitzgerald's resignation, Clarke W. Brown, the deputy secretary of state who had held the office for over 25 years, be appointed to fill the vacancy until the newly elected secretary of state took office on January 1, 1935. Brown lived in Lansing at the time. Brown was appointed by Governor Comstock, as planned, on November 15, and was sworn in to the position the same day. Shortly after being sworn in, Brown appointed Secretary of State-elect Orville E. Atwood as deputy secretary of state, and Atwood was sworn in as deputy secretary on November 15 as well. Brown was a Republican.

On January 15, 1935, Brown was appointed by the Michigan public utilities commission as secretary of the commission.

Personal life
Brown's wife died on November 5, 1940. Together, they had two children.

Death
Brown died of a heart attack in his home in Roscommon, Michigan on May 24, 1956.

References

Year of birth missing
1956 deaths
Michigan Republicans
Politicians from Lansing, Michigan
People from Roscommon County, Michigan
Secretaries of State of Michigan
20th-century American politicians